Celestina Cordero (April 6, 1787 – January 18, 1862), was an educator who in 1820 founded the first school for girls in San Juan, Puerto Rico.

Early years
Cordero (birth name: Celestina Cordero y Molina ) was second of three children born in San Juan, Puerto Rico to Lucas Cordero and Rita Molina. Her older sister was named Gregoria and her younger brother was Rafael Cordero. Cordero's father, a former slave, was a "Freeman." In 1789, the Spanish Crown issued the "Royal Decree of Graces of 1789," also known as El Código Negro (The Black Code). In accordance with El Código Negro a slave could buy their freedom and thus a former slave would become known as “freeman” or “freewoman.”

Cordero's family moved to the town of San German. Her father was an experienced artisan who also worked in the tobacco fields. During his free time he taught his children and those in the neighborhood his artisan skills, while Cordero's mother taught her children the importance of obtaining an education.

Cordero's parents taught her and her siblings how to read and write. Inspired by her mother's teachings, Cordero developed the love of teaching others. It was in San German where Cordero and her brother began their careers as educators.

Educator
During the Spanish colonization of the island, Puerto Rico, which depended on an agricultural economy, had an illiteracy rate of over 80% at the beginning of the 19th century. Most women were home educated. The first library in Puerto Rico was established in 1642 in the Convent of San Francisco, and access to its books was limited to those who belonged to the religious order. The only women who had access to the libraries and who could afford books, were the wives and daughters of Spanish government officials or wealthy landowners. Those who were poor had to resort to oral story-telling in what are traditionally known in Puerto Rico as Coplas and Decimas.

Cordero and her brother moved back to San Juan. Despite the fact that she was subject to racial discrimination because she was a black free woman, she continued to pursue her goal of teaching others regardless of their race and or social standing. In 1820, Cordero founded the first school for girls in San Juan, the first of its kind in Puerto Rico. Cordero also presented herself as a public speaker in favor of women's public education. After several years of struggle, the Spanish government officially gave her the title of teacher and accredited her school as an official educational institution.

Legacy
Cordero never married and died penniless in her home in San Juan on January 18, 1862. Puerto Rico recognized her brother Rafael as "The Father of Public Education" in Puerto Rico. However, her contributions to the educational system of the island are seldom mentioned. On December 9, 2013, Pope Francis advanced the sainthood of her brother when he declared that he lived the Christian virtues in a heroic way and is venerable.

In 2012, the library of the Dr. José Celso Barbosa Jr. High School dedicated its "Women Day" to Celestina Cordero.

Further reading
Remedios: Stories of Earth and Iron from the History of Puertorriquenas; by Aurora Levins Morales; pub. South End Press;

See also

List of Puerto Ricans
History of women in Puerto Rico
List of Puerto Ricans of African descent
African immigration to Puerto Rico

Notes

References

Puerto Rican educators
People from San Juan, Puerto Rico
1787 births
1862 deaths